Glenea chalybeata is a species of beetle in the family Cerambycidae. It was described by James Thomson in 1860.

References

chalybeata
Beetles described in 1860